Mar is a village in Aq Kahriz Rural District, Nowbaran District, Saveh County, Markazi Province, Iran. At the 2006 census, its population was 139, in 51 families.

References 

Populated places in Saveh County